Biarchedi Peak is a mountain peak on the south of the Baltoro Glacier in Pakistan. In its southwest is Masherbrum (7,806 m) and in its east is the Mitre Peak (6,010 m). In its northeast is the Biarchedi Glacier that flows north into the Baltoro Glacier.

See also 
Northern Areas

References

External links 
 Northern Pakistan detailed placemarks in Google Earth

Mountains of Gilgit-Baltistan
Six-thousanders of the Karakoram